Chintapally is a village in the Nalgonda district of the Indian state of Telangana. It is located in Chintapally mandal of Devarakonda division.

References

Villages in Nalgonda district
Mandal headquarters in Nalgonda district